Atiq mosque means the "old mosque".  It may refer to:
Atiq Mosque (Benghazi), in Benghazi, Libya
Atiq Mosque, Awjila, in the oasis town of Awjila, Libya